Tholu bommalata is the shadow puppet theatre tradition of the state of Andhra Pradesh in India. Its performers are part of a group of wandering entertainers and peddlers who pass through villages during the course of a year and offer to sing ballads, tell fortunes, sell amulets, perform acrobatics, charm snakes, weave fishnets, tattoo local people and mend pots. This ancient custom, which for centuries before radio, film, and television provided knowledge of Hindu epics and local folk tales, not to mention news, spread to the most remote corners of the Indian subcontinent. Tholu bommalata literally means "the dance of leather puppets" (tholu – "leather" and bommalata – "puppet dance").

The puppeteers comprise some of the various entertainers who perform all night and usually reenact various stories from Hindu epics such as the Ramayana and Mahabharata.

Tholu Bommalaata 

The performance begins with a series of sung invocations and a line of ornate, strikingly stylized puppets pinned in overlapping fashion onto the sides of the screen. The puppets are mounted in the middle on a palm stem, extended to form a handle used to move the body of the puppet. Their articulated arms are moved with detachable sticks that have a small piece of string with a peg at the end, which slip into holes on the hands. Generally, one puppeteer manipulates all three sticks of a single puppet, holding the central handle stick in one hand and two arm-control sticks in the other. Often two to three puppeteers operate puppets on the screen at the same time, each one delivering the lines for his or her own puppet.

As the players manipulate the puppets, placing them on the screen and then moving them away, they create the illusion of the figures suddenly materializing and then fading out. They also cause the figures to walk, sway, hop, and fly through the air. They can swivel a dancer's detachable head and manipulate her hands while keeping her hips swaying to create a remarkable illusion of twirling.

The puppeteers accompany all the character's speeches with animated movement of the arms and hands, which they can flip over to create a three-dimensional effect. The swaying of freely dangling legs also adds to the feeling of animation. When several puppets are stationary on the screen at the same time, they can be pinned to the screen with date palm thorns. A puppet can be rapidly pinned with one or two of the long, thin thorns passed through perforations in a headdress or shoulder ornaments. Such puppets are still able to engage in animated conversation by means of the sticks moving their hands. Characters that engage in rough fighting, such as the monkey king Hanuman or the jesters, are often held from the hip, enabling them to be moved with greater control than by the central stick alone.

Every few minutes throughout the performance, the action will be broken by the episodes of broad comic relief from the jesters speaking in a slangy, quirky style and engaging in slapstick antics. Some of these depend on a strong dose of scatological humor, puns or risqué allusions. Except for certain commonly used expletives, their language is not obscene, though sequences may be bawdy to a degree not observed in other popular forms of entertainment.

Interspersed with spoken dialogue, verse passages in literary Telugu and even Sanskrit are sung with instrumental accompaniment. These occur especially in contexts of heightened emotion or important events, rather like the arias in European operas. The players serve as their own musicians and all members of the troupe know the music that accompanies the various passages.

Musical instruments 
The musical instruments consist of a harmonium, a portable keyboard organ that sometimes serves only as a drone; a long, two-headed South Indian drum with tapering ends (mrudangam); strings of bells worn on the ankles and wrists; and pairs of finger cymbals. A wooden shoe with stilts is used to keep its wearer above the mud during the rainy season, and can be struck against schoolchildren's seating planks to create dramatic clacking and banging sound effects for fight scenes.

The singing style and the conventions of vocal delivery that accompany tholu bommalata closely resemble the form of singing from an old-fashioned drama genre known as Satyabhamakalapam. Accompanied only by the drum and finger cymbals, the player sings raising his hand up to one ear, as if to listen to what he is singing.

Puppets and cinema
Comparisons of shadow plays to movies can be informative. The shadow play was an ingenious technology of animating pictures, developed centuries before the advent of the motion picture industry. Here was a method of enabling four or five people to bring a hundred or more colorful mythological characters to life in the most remote village, all accompanied by virtuoso singing, contagious rhythms, and dramatic sound effects. The characters' costumes were elaborate, with swirling sashes and ornate necklaces and garlands, all cut to let points of light glisten in intricate patterns.

Puppet making
Three types of skins have been used to manufacture puppets:  antelope, spotted deer and goat. Antelope skins are reserved for making a limited number of auspicious characters, such as the gods and epic heroes. Deer skin, noted for its strength and resistance to rough handling, is employed in the figures of the warrior Bhima and the ten-headed demon king Ravana. All other puppets are typically made from goat skin, readily available locally.  Most puppets are made from a single skin, though some require more. At least four skins are necessary for Ravana – one for his body, one for his legs, and one to make each set of five arms.

Current state of affairs
The shadow play has been only one set of techniques for dramatizing the vastly rich Hindu epics. It has now been superseded by motion pictures and television, which have reinvigorated the epics for the electronic age. But the shadow play was a brilliant innovation, one whose visual artifacts hold clues to the history of South Asian art and drama and deserve to be preserved for the delight of generations to come.

See also
 Togalu gombeyaata, a similar form of puppetry in the neighbouring state of Karnataka

References

Anthropology
Culture of Andhra Pradesh
Puppetry in India
Cultural heritage of India
Tourism in Andhra Pradesh
Geographical indications in Andhra Pradesh
Shadow play